This is a list of well-known object–relational mapping software. It is not up-to-date or all-inclusive.

Java
Apache Cayenne, open-source for Java
Apache OpenJPA, open-source for Java
DataNucleus, open-source JDO and JPA implementation (formerly known as JPOX)
Ebean, open-source ORM framework
EclipseLink, Eclipse persistence platform
Enterprise JavaBeans (EJB)
Enterprise Objects Framework, Mac OS X/Java, part of Apple WebObjects
Hibernate, open-source ORM framework, widely used
Java Data Objects (JDO)
JOOQ Object Oriented Querying (jOOQ)
Kodo, commercial implementation of both Java Data Objects and Java Persistence API
TopLink by Oracle

iOS
Core Data by Apple for Mac OS X and iOS

.NET
Base One Foundation Component Library, free or commercial
Dapper, open source
Entity Framework, included in .NET Framework 3.5 SP1 and above
iBATIS, free open source, maintained by ASF but now inactive.
LINQ to SQL, included in .NET Framework 3.5
NHibernate, open source
nHydrate, open source
Quick Objects, free or commercial

Objective-C, Cocoa

 Enterprise Objects, one of the first commercial OR mappers, available as part of WebObjects
 Core Data, object graph management framework with several persistent stores, ships with Mac OS X and iOS

Perl
DBIx::Class

PHP
Laravel, framework that contains an ORM called "Eloquent" an ActiveRecord implementation.
Doctrine, open source ORM for PHP 5.2.3, 5.3.X., 7.4.X Free software (MIT)
CakePHP, ORM and framework for PHP 5, open source (scalars, arrays, objects); based on database introspection, no class extending
CodeIgniter, framework that includes an ActiveRecord implementation
Yii, ORM and framework for PHP 5, released under the BSD license. Based on the ActiveRecord pattern
FuelPHP, ORM and framework for PHP 5.3, released under the MIT license. Based on the ActiveRecord pattern.
Laminas, framework that includes a table data gateway and row data gateway implementations
Propel, ORM and query-toolkit for PHP 5, inspired by Apache Torque, free software, MIT
Qcodo, ORM and framework for PHP 5, open source
QCubed, A community driven fork of Qcodo
Redbean, ORM layer for PHP 5, for creating and maintaining tables on the fly, open source, BSD
Skipper, visualization tool and a code/schema generator for PHP ORM frameworks, commercial

Python
Django, ActiveRecord ORM included in Django framework, open source
SQLAlchemy, open source, a Data Mapper ORM
SQLObject, open source
Storm, open source (LGPL 2.1) developed at Canonical Ltd.
Tryton, open source
web2py, the facilities of an ORM are handled by the DAL in web2py, open source
Odoo – Formerly known as OpenERP, It is an Open Source ERP in which ORM is included.

Ruby
 iBATIS (inactive)
 ActiveRecord
 DataMapper

Smalltalk
 TOPLink/Smalltalk, by Oracle, the Smalltalk predecessor of the Java version of TOPLink

See also
 Comparison of object–relational mapping software

References

Object-relational mapping software